"Rock You Like a Hurricane" is a song by the German hard rock band Scorpions, considered their signature song. The song was released as the lead single from their ninth studio album, Love at First Sting (1984). It was written by Klaus Meine, Herman Rarebell, Rudolf Schenker and arranged/produced by Dieter Dierks. The lyrics of "Rock You Like a Hurricane" also reference the title of the album on which it originally appeared – Love at First Sting.

Musical style
The song is a combination of glam metal, heavy metal, hard rock, and arena rock.

Chart performance
"Rock You Like a Hurricane" reached number 25 in the US Billboard Hot 100, greatly contributing to the album's success, and MTV put the video in heavy rotation.

Accolades
In 2006, VH1 named "Rock You Like a Hurricane" number 31 on their 40 Greatest Metal Songs and in 2009 it was named the 18th greatest hard rock song of all time also by VH1. On 15 November 2010 it was named the fourth best riff of the 1980s. The racetrack depicted on the single's sleeve corresponds to the Circuito Permanente de Jerez, located in Spain.

Re-recordings
A new version was recorded in 2000 as "Hurricane 2000" on the album Moment of Glory, featuring Berlin Philharmonic Orchestra backing the track. In the same way, it was titled "Hurricane 2001" when played on the follow-up Acoustica. A third re-recording by the band features on their album Comeblack, released in 2011. The 2011 Comeblack re-recording was featured in the 2014 ad for Fiber One cookies, the film Scouts Guide to the Zombie Apocalypse, and in an episode of the TV shows It's Always Sunny in Philadelphia and Stranger Things. A version recorded in Spanish by Steph Honde and Micki Milosevic under the name of Unprotected Innocence was featured in and on the score for the 2019 Hellboy film. Rachel Bloom recorded a version of the song for Trolls World Tour as her character Barb.

Personnel
Band members
 Klaus Meine – lead vocals
 Rudolf Schenker – rhythm guitar, backing vocals
 Matthias Jabs – lead guitar, rhythm guitar
 Francis Buchholz – bass
 Herman Rarebell – drums

Production
Dieter Dierks – producer, mixing
Gerd Rautenbach – engineer, mastering

Charts

Certifications

References

Scorpions (band) songs
1984 songs
1984 singles
Songs written by Rudolf Schenker
Songs written by Klaus Meine
Mercury Records singles
Harvest Records singles